Neu-Isenburg is a town in Germany, located in the Offenbach district of Hesse. It is part of the Frankfurt Rhein-Main urban area and has a population of 38,204 (2020). The town is known nowadays mainly for its regionally used shopping centre, the Isenburg-Zentrum (IZ), the Hugenottenhalle, the Hotel Kempinski Frankfurt, the Autokino Gravenbruch (the oldest drive-in cinema in Europe), the Sportpark, the Waldschwimmbad (swimming pool) and not least of all its central location near Frankfurt Airport.

Geography

Neighbouring communities 
Neu-Isenburg borders in the west and north on the district-free city of Frankfurt am Main, in the east on the district-free city of Offenbach and in the south on the towns of Dreieich, Langen and Mörfelden-Walldorf (Groß-Gerau district).

Constituent communities 
In 1959, building work began on the Wohnstadt im Grünen ("Living Town in the Green"), as it was marketed. This was Gravenbruch. Almost 7,000 people found a new home in this satellite town between the main town and Heusenstamm, lying in the woods. Owing to the great number of young families that moved there, this constituent community was known as the town with Europe's densest population of children. It is also well known for the Kempinski-Hotel and the drive-in cinema.

With the amalgamation of the formerly self-administering community of Zeppelinheim in the course of municipal reform in 1977, Neu-Isenburg also stretched farther westwards. Here is found the Zeppelinmuseum.

History 
Neu-Isenburg was founded on 24 July 1699 as a town of exiles by Huguenots, French Protestants who had had to flee their homeland after the Edict of Nantes was revoked. Their new landlord, Count Johann Philipp von Isenburg-Offenbach, guaranteed them safety, the free use of the French language and religious freedom.

He gave them leave to settle in the Wildbann Dreieich, an old royal hunting forest, in the place where in the Middle Ages the pilgrimage chapel Zum Heiligen Kreuz ("To the Holy Cross") once stood. By way of thanks to the Count, the town was named Neu-Isenburg after him. The town plan was laid out by Andreas Loeber in a right-angled grid pattern. From corners ran diagonal streets to the marketplace. Also, the middles of the outer sides were linked by streets to the square marketplace. This township survives today in the streets of Kronengasse, Pfarrgasse, Löwengasse and Hirtengasse.

Neu-Isenburg was one of the planned towns of the 17th and 18th centuries. The settlers at first worked at farming, but later turned back to the handicraft trades that they had learnt, such as the stocking knitter's craft, thereby laying the groundwork for Neu-Isenburg's economic development. The surrounding communities eyed the French settlers with great mistrust and called the town welsches Dorf (the German word welsch refers to peoples who speak Romance languages, especially French; it is cognate with the English word Welsh, but does not have the same meaning).
On 20 May 1700 – a Thursday – the clergyman Isaac Bermond held the first church services under an old oak in the middle of the church square.

About 1701, the Forsthaus was built (today an inn called Frankfurter Haus) by the city of Frankfurt am Main at the city limits with Neu-Isenburg. The first French Reformed church was built of wood between 1702 and 1706. The foundation stone was laid on Ascension Day 1702. Likewise in 1702, the Town Hall was built at the marketplace, and the Haus zum Löwen was mentioned for the first time. This was used until 1918 as an inn called Au Lion d'Or ("At the Golden Lion"), and today it houses the local history museum.

The first school followed in 1704, and in 1705 the Bansamühle (mill). The wooden church was replaced between 1773 and 1775 with a stone building. In 1781, the first German-language school was built.

After the Congress of Vienna in 1815, the County of Ysenburg, together with the Oberamt of Offenbach and its member municipalities, passed to the Grand Duchy of Hesse. In 1828, the Prussian-Hessian Customs Union built a customs house (Frankfurter Straße 10) as its main customs office on the border with what was then the Free City of Frankfurt.

Despite considerable reservations, German families, too, were moving into the town beginning in the 18th century, leading to the church's having to hold services alternately in German and French as of 1761, much to the French-speaking population's chagrin. In the end, German was confirmed as the town's official language in 1829.

In 1846, the Main-Neckar railway near Neu-Isenburg was completed, but the town did not get its own railway station until 1852.
Other events in Neu-Isenburg's history, in brief, are as follows:
1860 The firm Müller markets Frankfurter Würstchen (sausages, but not the kind often called "Frankfurters" in the English-speaking world) for the first time.
1865 First postal station in Neu-Isenburg
1875 Volunteer fire brigade was founded
1885 The Waldeisenbahn, a steam tramway to Frankfurt, was opened (now tramline 17, and electric).
4 February 1889 Town rights were granted.
1889 The Waldbahn, a railway, began running to Frankfurt.
April 1896 The Höhere Bürgerschule (now Goetheschule) took on its task as Neu-Isenburg's first secondary school.
1899 On the occasion of its bicentenary, Neu-Isenburg received a coat of arms.
1907 The Jewish Women's Federation's home for Jewish girls was founded by Bertha Pappenheim.
23 October 1911 Consecration of the first Catholic church, St. Josef.
Between 1943 and 1945 the town suffered heavy damage from air raids.
1945 A broad area in the town's west had to be evacuated for the Occupying Power
1959 Building work began on Gravenbruch, a residential neighbourhood, after the woods there had been cleared.
1960 The Autokino Gravenbruch, Europe's first drive-in cinema, was opened.
1 January 1977 Amalgamation of the formerly self-administering community of Zeppelinheim, which itself had been cobbled together from parts of the self-administering municipal areas of Mitteldick and Gundwald (the latter in Groß-Gerau district) and parts of the community of Kelsterbach on 1 January 1938.
1997 Neu-Isenburg was linked to the Rhine-Main S-Bahn.

Population development 
In 1834, Neu-Isenburg had only 1,762 inhabitants. By 1939, there were 15,081. After Zeppelinheim was amalgamated and Gravenbruch had been built, the population reached 35,000 by 1983.

Politics

Town council 
The municipal elections held on 6 March 2016 yielded the following results, compared to earlier municipal elections:

The CDU formed a coalition with Die Grünen (“The Greens”), the FDP and the Freie Wähler (“Free Voters”).

Mayors 
Past mayoral elections have yielded the following results:

At the last election on 27 September 2015, the independent candidate Herbert Hunkel, who was supported by the CDU, was reelected with 77.4% of the vote over Thilo Seipel (FDP, 22.6%). Voter turnout was 30.3%.

Twin towns – sister cities

Neu-Isenburg is twinned with:

 Andrézieux-Bouthéon, France
 Bad Vöslau, Austria
 Chiusi, Italy
 Dacorum, England, United Kingdom
 Veauche, France
 Weida, Germany

Friendly cities
Neu-Isenburg also has friendly relations with:
 Alexandria, Minnesota, United States
 Sighisoara, Romania

Economy and infrastructure

Economy 
Given its proximity to the trade fair city of Frankfurt and to Frankfurt Airport, Neu-Isenburg is an attractive location for businesses of the most varied sectors. Among them are many hotels, which see more than 230,000 overnight stays every year, the highest figure in the Offenbach district.

Over time, the town has converted itself from a location for producing businesses to a service-industry-based location and is among the biggest high-technology locations in the Frankfurt Rhine Main Region.

Some of the businesses established here are:
 Aramark Holdings GmbH & Co. KG
 eprimo GmbH
 Harley-Davidson GmbH (Managing Germany, Austria and Switzerland)
 Jeppesen GmbH
 Kempinski Frankfurt AG
 Lorenz Snack-World GmbH (Bahlsen)
 Lufthansa Service GmbH (LSG Sky Chefs)
 AirPlus International
 Pepsi-Cola GmbH
 Symantec Corporation
 Keyence Deutschland GmbH
 UL International Germany GmbH
 Sescoi GmbH
 Alpha Industries GmbH & Co. KG
 Banque PSA Finance, SA.
 KarstadtQuelle Bank
 G. A. Müller GmbH (meat products factory, oldest manufacturer of the original Frankfurter Würstchen)
 Hans Wirth GmbH & Co. KG (meat products factory, manufacturer of the original Frankfurter Würstchen)

Around the 1980s and 1990s the airline Condor was headquartered in Neu-Isenburg.

Transport 
The town is close to several routes of the German Autobahn network (A 3, A 5, A 661).

It is the only station in Hesse that has loading tracks for a motorail service, connecting to several destinations in Austria, Italy and southern France. This service was discontinued in 2014. However the terminal remains.  runs over the Mannheim–Frankfurt railway, stopping at Zeppelinheim station.

The Frankfurt tram network has a terminal at Isenburger Schneise, just within the Frankfurt boundary for reasons of municipal identity, linking the northern margin of Neu-Isenburg with Frankfurt Central Station.

Frankfurt Airport lies at the town limits.

Culture and sightseeing

Hugenottenhalle 
Neu-Isenburg is known far beyond its limits for the various events staged at the Hugenottenhalle. In this multipurpose hall with a variable capacity of up to 2,000 people, rock concerts are held, guest theatrical performances are given and dancing and music are performed. Citizens are offered a comprehensive cultural programme covering every genre.

Open-Doors-Festival 
Neu-Isenburg is especially well known in the Frankfurt Rhine Main Region for its yearly summertime Open-Doors-Festival (formerly Musikspektakel). For three days, some 40 different bands and artists from all genres of music play. The free event is attended by some 15,000 guests and is held on several different stages throughout the town area.

Fastnacht 
The parade through town on Shrove Monday (Rosenmontag) — sometimes called Lumpenmontag in Neu-Isenburg — enjoys great popularity.

Education 
 Primary schools
 Albert-Schweitzer-Schule 
 Hans-Christian-Andersen-Schule
 Wilhelm-Hauff-Schule
 Ludwig-Uhland-Schule, Gravenbruch
 Selma-Lagerlöf-Schule, Zeppelinheim
 Gymnasium
 Goetheschule 
 Abendgymnasium (formerly Schule im Buchenbusch) 
 Comprehensive school
 Brüder-Grimm-Schule 
 Special school
 Friedrich-Fröbel-Schule, school for learning help and speech therapy
 Other schools
 Music school
 Folk high school

Media
Ärzte-Zeitung, a newspaper for physicians, has its headquarters in Neu-Isenburg.

Notable people

Bertha Pappenheim (1859–1936), feminist and social worker
Franz Völker (1899–1965), operatic singer
Wilhelm Leichum (1911–1941), athlete
Anny Schlemm (born 1929), operatic singer
Peter Dietrich (born 1944), footballer
Horst Ludwig Störmer (born 1949), physicist, Nobel laureate
 (born 1957), artist and graphic artist
Torsten de Winkel (born 1965), guitarist

Honorary citizens
Rudi Seiferlein (1921–2010), honorary chairman of the community of interests (IG) associations, posthumous award of honorary citizenship in March 2011

References

External links 

 
Hugenottenhalle cultural link 
Verein für Geschichte Heimatpflege und Kultur 
 
 Der Isenburger – Quarterly publication and online archive

Offenbach (district)